Ethylene (IUPAC name: ethene) is a hydrocarbon which has the formula  or . It is a colourless, flammable gas with a faint "sweet and musky" odour when pure. It is the simplest alkene (a hydrocarbon with carbon-carbon double bonds).

Ethylene is widely used in the chemical industry, and its worldwide production (over 150 million tonnes in 2016) exceeds that of any other organic compound. Much of this production goes toward polyethylene, a widely used plastic containing polymer chains of ethylene units in various chain lengths. Ethylene is also an important natural plant hormone and is used in agriculture to force the ripening of fruits. The hydrate of ethylene is ethanol.

Structure and properties

This hydrocarbon has four hydrogen atoms bound to a pair of carbon atoms that are connected by a double bond. All six atoms that comprise ethylene are coplanar. The H-C-H angle is 117.4°, close to the 120° for ideal sp² hybridized carbon. The molecule is also relatively weak: rotation about the C-C bond is a very low energy process that requires breaking the π-bond by supplying heat at 50°C.

The π-bond in the ethylene molecule is responsible for its useful reactivity. The double bond is a region of high electron density, thus it is susceptible to attack by electrophiles. Many reactions of ethylene are catalyzed by transition metals, which bind transiently to the ethylene using both the π and π* orbitals.

Being a simple molecule, ethylene is spectroscopically simple. Its UV-vis spectrum is still used as a test of theoretical methods.

Uses
Major industrial reactions of ethylene include in order of scale: 1) polymerization, 2) oxidation, 3) halogenation and hydrohalogenation, 4) alkylation, 5) hydration, 6) oligomerization, and 7) hydroformylation. In the United States and Europe, approximately 90% of ethylene is used to produce ethylene oxide, ethylene dichloride, ethylbenzene and polyethylene. Most of the reactions with ethylene are electrophilic addition.

Polymerization

Polyethylene consumes more than half of the world's ethylene supply. Polyethylene, also called polyethene and polythene, is the world's most widely used plastic. It is primarily used to make films in packaging, carrier bags and trash liners. Linear alpha-olefins, produced by oligomerization (formation of short polymers) are used as precursors, detergents, plasticisers, synthetic lubricants, additives, and also as co-monomers in the production of polyethylenes.

Oxidation
Ethylene is oxidized to produce ethylene oxide, a key raw material in the production of surfactants and detergents by ethoxylation. Ethylene oxide is also hydrolyzed to produce ethylene glycol, widely used as an automotive antifreeze as well as higher molecular weight glycols, glycol ethers, and polyethylene terephthalate.

Ethylene undergoes oxidation by palladium to give acetaldehyde. This conversion remains a major industrial process (10M kg/y). The process proceeds via the initial complexation of ethylene to a Pd(II) center.

Halogenation and hydrohalogenation
Major intermediates from the halogenation and hydrohalogenation of ethylene include ethylene dichloride, ethyl chloride, and ethylene dibromide. The addition of chlorine entails "oxychlorination", i.e. chlorine itself is not used. Some products derived from this group are polyvinyl chloride, trichloroethylene, perchloroethylene, methyl chloroform, polyvinylidene chloride and copolymers, and ethyl bromide.

Alkylation
Major chemical intermediates from the alkylation with ethylene is ethylbenzene, precursor to styrene. Styrene is used principally in polystyrene for packaging and insulation, as well as in styrene-butadiene rubber for tires and footwear. On a smaller scale, ethyltoluene, ethylanilines, 1,4-hexadiene, and aluminium alkyls. Products of these intermediates include polystyrene, unsaturated polyesters and ethylene-propylene terpolymers.

Oxo reaction
The hydroformylation (oxo reaction) of ethylene results in propionaldehyde, a precursor to propionic acid and n-propyl alcohol.

Hydration
Ethylene has long represented the major nonfermentative precursor to ethanol. The original method entailed its conversion to diethyl sulfate, followed by hydrolysis. The main method practiced since the mid-1990s is the direct hydration of ethylene catalyzed by solid acid catalysts:
C2H4  +  H2O  →    CH3CH2OH

Dimerization to butenes
Ethylene is dimerized by hydrovinylation to give n-butenes using processes licensed by Lummus or IFP. The Lummus process produces mixed n-butenes (primarily 2-butenes) while the IFP process produces 1-butene. 1-Butene is used as a comonomer in the production of certain kinds of polyethylene.

Fruit and flowering

Ethylene is a hormone that affects the ripening and flowering of many plants.  It is widely used to control freshness in horticulture and fruits.  The scrubbing of naturally occurring ethylene delays ripening.

Niche uses
An example of a niche use is as an anesthetic agent (in an 85% ethylene/15% oxygen ratio). Another use is as a welding gas.

Production
Global ethylene production was 107 million tonnes in 2005, 109 million tonnes in 2006, 138 million tonnes in 2010, and 141 million tonnes in 2011. By 2013, ethylene was produced by at least 117 companies in 32 countries. To meet the ever-increasing demand for ethylene, sharp increases in production facilities are added globally, particularly in the Mideast and in China.  production releases significant greenhouse gas emissions.

Industrial process
Ethylene is produced by several methods in the petrochemical industry. A primary method is steam cracking (SC) where hydrocarbons and steam are heated to 750–950 °C. This process converts large hydrocarbons into smaller ones and introduces unsaturation. When ethane is the feedstock, ethylene is the product. Ethylene is separated from the resulting mixture by repeated compression and distillation. In Europe and Asia, ethylene is obtained mainly from cracking naphtha, gasoil and condensates with the coproduction of propylene, C4 olefins and aromatics (pyrolysis gasoline). Other technologies employed for the production of ethylene include oxidative coupling of methane, Fischer-Tropsch synthesis, methanol-to-olefins (MTO), and catalytic dehydrogenation.

Laboratory synthesis
Although of great value industrially, ethylene is rarely synthesized in the laboratory and is ordinarily purchased. It can be produced via dehydration of ethanol with sulfuric acid or in the gas phase with aluminium oxide.

Biosynthesis
Ethylene is produced from methionine in nature.  The immediate precursor is 1-aminocyclopropane-1-carboxylic acid.

Ligand

Ethylene is a fundamental ligand in transition metal alkene complexes. One of the first organometallic compounds, Zeise's salt is a complex of ethylene. Useful reagents containing ethylene include Pt(PPh3)2(C2H4) and Rh2Cl2(C2H4)4. The Rh-catalysed hydroformylation of ethylene is conducted on industrial scale to provide propionaldehyde.

History
Some geologists and scholars believe that the famous Greek Oracle at Delphi (the Pythia) went into her trance-like state as an effect of ethylene rising from ground faults.

Ethylene appears to have been discovered by Johann Joachim Becher, who obtained it by heating ethanol with sulfuric acid; he mentioned the gas in his Physica Subterranea (1669). Joseph Priestley also mentions the gas in his Experiments and observations relating to the various branches of natural philosophy: with a continuation of the observations on air (1779), where he reports that Jan Ingenhousz saw ethylene synthesized in the same way by a Mr. Enée in Amsterdam in 1777 and that Ingenhousz subsequently produced the gas himself. The properties of ethylene were studied in 1795 by four Dutch chemists, Johann Rudolph Deimann, Adrien Paets van Troostwyck, Anthoni Lauwerenburgh and Nicolas Bondt, who found that it differed from hydrogen gas and that it contained both carbon and hydrogen. This group also discovered that ethylene could be combined with chlorine to produce the oil of the Dutch chemists, 1,2-dichloroethane; this discovery gave ethylene the name used for it at that time, olefiant gas (oil-making gas.) The term olefiant gas is in turn the etymological origin of the modern word "olefin", the class of hydrocarbons in which ethylene is the first member.

In the mid-19th century, the suffix -ene (an Ancient Greek root added to the end of female names meaning "daughter of") was widely used to refer to a molecule or part thereof that contained one fewer hydrogen atoms than the molecule being modified. Thus, ethylene was the "daughter of ethyl". The name ethylene was used in this sense as early as 1852.

In 1866, the German chemist August Wilhelm von Hofmann proposed a system of hydrocarbon nomenclature in which the suffixes -ane, -ene, -ine, -one, and -une were used to denote the hydrocarbons with 0, 2, 4, 6, and 8 fewer hydrogens than their parent alkane. In this system, ethylene became ethene. Hofmann's system eventually became the basis for the Geneva nomenclature approved by the International Congress of Chemists in 1892, which remains at the core of the IUPAC nomenclature. However, by that time, the name ethylene was deeply entrenched, and it remains in wide use today, especially in the chemical industry.

Following experimentation by Luckhardt, Crocker, and Carter at the University of Chicago, ethylene was used as an anesthetic. It remained in use through the 1940s use even while chloroform was being phased out. Its pungent odor and its explosive nature limit its use today.

Nomenclature
The 1979 IUPAC nomenclature rules made an exception for retaining the non-systematic name ethylene; however, this decision was reversed in the 1993 rules, and it remains unchanged in the newest 2013 recommendations, so the IUPAC name is now ethene. In the IUPAC system, the name ethylene is reserved for the divalent group -CH2CH2-. Hence, names like ethylene oxide and ethylene dibromide are permitted, but the use of the name ethylene for the two-carbon alkene is not. Nevertheless, use of the name ethylene for H2C=CH2 (and propylene for H2C=CHCH3) is still prevalent among chemists in North America.

Safety
Like all hydrocarbons, ethylene is a combustible asphyxiant. It is listed as an IARC class 3 carcinogen, since there is no current evidence that it causes cancer in humans.

See also
RediRipe, an ethylene detector in fruit.

References

External links 

International Chemical Safety Card 0475
MSDS

 
Alkenes
General anesthetics
Monomers
Commodity chemicals
Petrochemicals
Industrial gases
Organic compounds with 2 carbon atoms